The Barlow Endowment for Music Composition is a scholarship established in September 1983 through the generosity of Milton A. and Gloria Barlow.   Motivated by their love of music, the Barlows presented a substantial gift to Brigham Young University, engendering and supporting excellence in musical composition through the university and the BYU College of Fine Arts and Communications. 

The Barlow Endowment Board of Directors and Board of Advisors have subsequently been engaged in employing the proceeds of the Endowment to support four programs: The Barlow Prize, General Commissions, LDS Composer Commissions, and Education Grants.."  

Every year, the Endowment hosts an international composition competition.  Applications from across the globe are accepted and reviewed by a panel of musicians.  The winners are selected and commissioned to compose new works during the next year.

Barlow prize
Each year, the Barlow Endowment selects a genre for the Barlow Prize.  Arrangements are made for a piece to be composed for and performed by ensembles who specialize in that genre.

The 15- to 20-minute work is expected to meet the highest artistic requirements for the medium. Additional specifications for the work will be negotiated among the Barlow Endowment, the composer, and the performing consortium.

General commissions
Any composer, (or agent, artist or ensemble applying on behalf of a particular composer) may submit an application for a general commission.  The only requirement is that all requested application materials be submitted together.  

Composers applying for a general commission are to submit a request as to how much funding their piece will require, and for whom it will be written.

Composers seeking General or LDS commissions may not apply for both types of commissions during the same year and should submit no more than one proposal to any program.

LDS commissions
Composers who belong to the Church of Jesus Christ of Latter-day Saints (LDS) or any composer willing to address LDS subject matter can apply for an LDS commission.  

LDS subject matter would include LDS standard scriptural works, such as the Bible, the Book of Mormon, the Doctrine and Covenants, the Pearl of Great Price, and hymns from the LDS hymnbook.  Other texts that address LDS theology would also be considered "LDS subject matter."

Composers applying for an LDS commission are to submit a request as to how much funding their piece will require, and for whom it will be written.

Composers seeking General or LDS commissions may not apply for both types of commissions during the same year and should submit no more than one proposal to any program.

Education grants
The Barlow Education Grants are monies allocated from the Barlow Endowment to the composition faculty of the BYU School of Music. Faculty members use some of those funds to promote and facilitate their own work (copying costs, recordings, travel to premieres or conferences, etc.) and the rest to support the students and their work (via scholarships, travel funds, visiting lecturers and so forth).

Notable past winners

 Samuel Adler
 Matthew Barnson
 Kurt Bestor
 Judith Bingham
 William Bolcom
 Michael Colgrass
 Robert Cundick
 Brian Current
 Mario Davidovsky
 Stacy Garrop
 Daniel E. Gawthrop
 Henryk Gorecki
 Daron Hagen
 Stephen Hartke
 Aaron Jay Kernis
 Lowell Liebermann
 György Ligeti
 S. Andrew Lloyd
 Dan Locklair
 Harold Meltzer
 Haruhito Miyagi
 Tawnie Olson
 Forrest Pierce
 Narong Prangcharoen
 Kevin Puts
 David Rakowski
 Shulamit Ran
 Kurt Rohde
 Christopher Theofanidis
 Augusta Read Thomas
 Joan Tower
 George Tsontakis
 Eric Whitacre
 Mack Wilberg
 Charles Wuorinen

References

External links
 Barlow Endowment web page

1983 establishments in Utah
Brigham Young University